Casino de Port-Gentil is a casino in Port-Gentil, Gabon. It is located just north of Saint Louis Church and the École Mixte. The casino forms part of an entertainment complex in the city which includes "Le Galion" next door, the Supermarche Casino across the street and the City Sport Centre. It opens at 10pm from Thursday to Sunday and features blackjack, roulette, poker and slot machines.

References

Port-Gentil
Casinos in Gabon